Cienciała is a Polish surname. Notable people with the surname include:

 Anna M. Cienciala (1929–2014), Polish-American historian and author
 David Cienciala (born 1995), Czech ice hockey player
 Sławomir Cienciała (born 1983), Polish footballer

Polish-language surnames